In topology and related fields of mathematics, a topological space X is called a regular space if every closed subset C of X and a point p not contained in C admit non-overlapping open neighborhoods. Thus p and C can be separated by neighborhoods. This condition is known as Axiom T3. The term "T3 space" usually means "a regular Hausdorff space". These conditions are examples of separation axioms.

Definitions

A topological space X is a regular space if, given any closed set F and any point x that does not belong to F, there exists a neighbourhood U of x and a neighbourhood V of F that are disjoint. Concisely put, it must be possible to separate x and F with disjoint neighborhoods.

(A Hausdorff space or T2 space is a topological space in which any two distinct points are separated by neighbourhoods.) It turns out that a space is T3 if and only if it is both regular and T0. (A T0 or Kolmogorov space is a topological space in which any two distinct points are topologically distinguishable, i.e., for every pair of distinct points, at least one of them has an open neighborhood not containing the other.) Indeed, if a space is Hausdorff then it is T0, and each T0 regular space is Hausdorff: given two distinct points, at least one of them misses the closure of the other one, so (by regularity) there exist disjoint neighborhoods separating one point from (the closure of) the other.

Although the definitions presented here for "regular" and "T3" are not uncommon, there is significant variation in the literature: some authors switch the definitions of "regular" and "T3" as they are used here, or use both terms interchangeably. This article uses the term "regular" freely, but will usually say "regular Hausdorff", which is unambiguous, instead of the less precise "T3". For more on this issue, see History of the separation axioms.

A  is a topological space where every point has an open neighbourhood that is regular. Every regular space is locally regular, but the converse is not true. A classical example of a locally regular space that is not regular is the bug-eyed line.

Relationships to other separation axioms 
A regular space is necessarily also preregular, i.e., any two topologically distinguishable points can be separated by neighbourhoods.
Since a Hausdorff space is the same as a preregular T0 space, a regular space which is also T0 must be Hausdorff (and thus T3).
In fact, a regular Hausdorff space satisfies the slightly stronger condition T2½.
(However, such a space need not be completely Hausdorff.)
Thus, the definition of T3 may cite T0, T1, or T2½ instead of T2 (Hausdorffness); all are equivalent in the context of regular spaces.

Speaking more theoretically, the conditions of regularity and T3-ness are related by Kolmogorov quotients.
A space is regular if and only if its Kolmogorov quotient is T3; and, as mentioned, a space is T3 if and only if it's both regular and T0.
Thus a regular space encountered in practice can usually be assumed to be T3, by replacing the space with its Kolmogorov quotient.

There are many results for topological spaces that hold for both regular and Hausdorff spaces.
Most of the time, these results hold for all preregular spaces; they were listed for regular and Hausdorff spaces separately because the idea of preregular spaces came later.
On the other hand, those results that are truly about regularity generally don't also apply to nonregular Hausdorff spaces.

There are many situations where another condition of topological spaces (such as normality, pseudonormality, paracompactness, or local compactness) will imply regularity if some weaker separation axiom, such as preregularity, is satisfied.
Such conditions often come in two versions: a regular version and a Hausdorff version.
Although Hausdorff spaces aren't generally regular, a Hausdorff space that is also (say) locally compact will be regular, because any Hausdorff space is preregular.
Thus from a certain point of view, regularity is not really the issue here, and we could impose a weaker condition instead to get the same result.
However, definitions are usually still phrased in terms of regularity, since this condition is more well known than any weaker one.

Most topological spaces studied in mathematical analysis are regular; in fact, they are usually completely regular, which is a stronger condition.
Regular spaces should also be contrasted with normal spaces.

Examples and nonexamples 
A zero-dimensional space with respect to the small inductive dimension has a base consisting of clopen sets.
Every such space is regular.

As described above, any completely regular space is regular, and any T0 space that is not Hausdorff (and hence not preregular) cannot be regular.
Most examples of regular and nonregular spaces studied in mathematics may be found in those two articles.
On the other hand, spaces that are regular but not completely regular, or preregular but not regular, are usually constructed only to provide counterexamples to conjectures, showing the boundaries of possible theorems.
Of course, one can easily find regular spaces that are not T0, and thus not Hausdorff, such as an indiscrete space, but these examples provide more insight on the T0 axiom than on regularity.  An example of a regular space that is not completely regular is the Tychonoff corkscrew.

Most interesting spaces in mathematics that are regular also satisfy some stronger condition.
Thus, regular spaces are usually studied to find properties and theorems, such as the ones below, that are actually applied to completely regular spaces, typically in analysis.

There exist Hausdorff spaces that are not regular.  An example is the set R with the topology generated by sets of the form U — C, where U is an open set in the usual sense, and C is any countable subset of U.

Elementary properties 
Suppose that X is a regular space.
Then, given any point x and neighbourhood G of x, there is a closed neighbourhood E of x that is a subset of G.
In fancier terms, the closed neighbourhoods of x form a local base at x.
In fact, this property characterises regular spaces; if the closed neighbourhoods of each point in a topological space form a local base at that point, then the space must be regular.

Taking the interiors of these closed neighbourhoods, we see that the regular open sets form a base for the open sets of the regular space X.
This property is actually weaker than regularity; a topological space whose regular open sets form a base is semiregular.

References

Separation axioms
Properties of topological spaces
Topology